Devereux Court is a street in the City of Westminster that runs from Strand in the north to Essex Street in the south. It is entirely pedestrianised.

The street is named after Robert Devereux, 2nd Earl of Essex, whose Essex House mansion once occupied part of the site.

It is occupied by some barristers' chambers and three public houses: The George, The Devereux, and the Edgar Wallace. The Devereux stands on the site of the celebrated Grecian Coffee House, which shut in 1843.

References

External links 

http://www.plaquesoflondon.co.uk/page3277.htm

Streets in the City of London